Jean-Baptiste François Xavier Cousin De Grainville (3 April 1746 – 1 February 1805) was a French writer who wrote a seminal work of fantasy literature: Le Dernier Homme (The Last Man) (1805). This was the first modern novel to depict the end of the world.

The son of an army staff officer, de Grainville was born in Le Havre and was destined for the priesthood, like his brother, who became Bishop of Cahors. After attending school in Caen, he attended the Lycée Louis-le-Grand in Paris. De Grainville was ordained a priest in 1766 but left the priesthood during the French Revolution. He committed suicide at Amiens in 1805 and his novel was published posthumously.

References

Bibliography 

 Jean Gillet, « Du dernier au premier homme : Le brouillage des signes dans l’épopée de Grainville », Formes modernes de la poésie épique : nouvelles approches,  éd. et intro. par Judith Labarthe, Bruxelles, Peter Lang, 2004, (p. 113-27).
  Morton D. Paley, « Le Dernier Homme : the French Revolution as the failure of typology », Mosaic, hiver 1991, n°24 (1), (p. 67-76).

External links 
 Jean-Baptiste Cousin de Grainville on Data.bnf.fr

Clergy from Le Havre
1746 births
1805 deaths
French science fiction writers
Writers from Le Havre
18th-century French male writers
18th-century French novelists
18th-century French philosophers
18th-century French poets
French translators
Latin–French translators
Spanish–French translators
Italian–French translators
18th-century French translators
1800s suicides